Lakshmipur Adarsha samad government high School is a boy's high school located in Lakshmipur, Bangladesh. It is one of the oldest schools in the country. The school was established in 1886. by the summit of local advocates and authorised by the University of Kolkata. The school is under the Board of Intermediate and Secondary Education, Comilla.

References

High schools in Bangladesh
1886 establishments in British India
Educational institutions established in 1886